This is a list of notable shipbuilders and shipyards:

Africa

Egypt
 Suez shipyard
 Alexandria Shipyard

Asia

Azerbaijan
 Baku Shipyard

Bangladesh
FMC Dockyard Limited
 Ananda Shipyard and Shipways
 Bashundhara Steel & Engineering
 Khulna Shipyard
 Western Marine Shipyard
 Dockyard & Engineering Works Ltd

Mainland China
 China State Shipbuilding Corporation
 China Shipbuilding Industry Corporation
 Hudong-Zhonghua Shipbuilding
 Dalian Shipbuilding Industry Company
 Guangzhou Shipyard International
 Jiangnan Shipyard
 Yantai Raffles Shipyard

Hong Kong
 Hong Kong and Whampoa Dock (established 1863, merged 1973 into Hongkong United Dockyards)
 Hongkong United Dockyards (established 1973)
 Taikoo Dockyard (established 1902, merged 1973 into Hongkong United Dockyards)

India
 Mazagon Dock Limited, Mumbai, Maharashtra
  Cochin Shipyard Limited, Kochi, Kerala
 Chowgule Lavgan Drydock, Ratnagiri, Maharashtra
 Hindustan Shipyard Limited, Visakhapatnam, Andhra Pradesh
 Garden Reach Shipbuilders and Engineers, Kolkata, West Bengal
 Goa Shipyard Limited, Vasco da Gama, Goa
 Naval Dockyard (Bombay), Mumbai, Maharashtra
 Naval Dockyard (Visakhapatnam), Visakhapatnam, Andhra Pradesh
 Jawaharlal Nehru Port Trust, Navi Mumbai, Maharashtra
 Shalimar Works (1980) Ltd, Kolkata, West Bengal
 Hooghly Dock & Port Engineers Limited, Howrah, West Bengal
 Reliance Naval and Engineering Limited, Pipavav, Gujarat
 Bharati Defence And Infrastructure Limited, Mumbai, Maharashtra
 ABG Shipyard Limited, Mumbai, Maharashtra
 Hazira Port Private Limited, Hazira, Gujarat
 Adani Katupalli Port Private Limited, Kattupalli, Tamil Nadu
 Modest Infrastructure Ltd, Bhavnagar, Gujarat
 Tebma Shipyard Limited, Chennai, Tamil Nadu
 Timblo Drydocks Private Limited, Curchorem, Goa
 Titagarh Marines, Kolkata, West Bengal
 Western India Shipyard Limited, Mormugao, Goa

Indonesia
 PT PAL Indonesia
 PT Lundin Industry Invest
 PT Palindo Marine

Iran
 Sadra Shipyard
 Persian Gulf Shipbuilding

Israel
 Israel Shipyards
 IAI Ramta

Japan
 Imabari Shipbuilding Imabari
 30% of Japan Marine United – Universal Shipbuilding and IHI Marine United merger in 2013 
 Kawasaki Shipbuilding Corporation 
 Mitsubishi Heavy Industries (Nagasaki) 
 bought in 2020 Mitsui Engineering & Shipbuilding
 Sumitomo Heavy Industries Oppama

Malaysia
 Boustead Naval Shipyard Lumut
 Boustead Penang Shipyard Penang Island
 Labuan Shipyard and Engineering Labuan
 Malaysia Marine and Heavy Engineering Pasir Gudang
 Boustead Langkawi Shipyard Langkawi

Pakistan
 Karachi Shipyard & Engineering Works, Karachi
 PN Dockyard, Karachi

Philippines
 Austal Philippines Pty. Ltd. (Balamban, Cebu)
 Hanjin Heavy Industries Corporation Philippines (Zambales)
 Keppel Philippines Marine Batangas Shipyard (Bauan, Batangas)
 Keppel Philippines Marine Subic Shipyard (Subic, Zambales)

Qatar
 Nakilat Damen Shipyards Qatar

Saudi Arabia
 King Salman Global Maritime Industries Complex

Singapore
 ST Engineering Marine
 Strategic Marine (S) Pte Ltd

South Korea
 Daewoo Shipbuilding & Marine Engineering Co., Ltd. Geoje
 Hanjin Heavy Industries Co., Ltd. Busan
 Hyundai Heavy Industries Co., Ltd. Ulsan
 Hyundai Mipo Dockyard Co., Ltd. Ulsan
 Hyundai Samho Heavy Industries Co., Ltd. Yeongam
 Samsung Heavy Industries Co., Ltd. Geoje

Sri Lanka
 Colombo Dockyard

Taiwan
 CSBC Corporation, Taiwan (Kaohsiung)
 Horizon Yachts (Kaohsiung)
 Jong Shyn Shipbuilding Company

Thailand
 Italthai Industrial Group
 The Bangkok Dock Company (Sattahip)

Europe

Austria–Hungary
 Stabilimento Tecnico Triestino

Bulgaria
 Odessos Shiprepair yard, Varna

Croatia
 Brodogradilište 3. Maj Rijeka
 Kraljevica Shipyard Brodogradilište Kraljevica
 Brodosplit Split
 Uljanik Pula

Denmark
 Odense Steel Shipyard
 Aalborg Shipyard
 Burmeister & Wain (1865-1996)
 Orlogsværftet (1500s-1992)
 Svendborg Skibsværft (1907-2001)

Estonia
 Baltic Workboats Shipyard
 BLRT Grupp

Finland
 Åbo Skeppswarf
 Aker Arctic
 Andrée & Rosenqvist
 Arctech Helsinki Shipyard
 Crichton (Turku shipyard)
 Crichton-Vulcan
 Helsingfors Skeppsdocka
 Helsinki Shipyard
 Hietalahti shipyard
 Kone- ja Siltarakennus
 Laivateollisuus
 Lehtoniemi
 Meyer Turku
 Perno shipyard
 Rauma Marine Constructions
 Rauma shipyard
 Sandvikens Skeppsdocka och Mekaniska Verkstad
 STX Finland
 Turku Repair Yard
 Uki Workboat
 Vulcan (Turku shipyard)
 Vuosaari shipyard
 Wärtsilä Marine
 Wm. Crichton & Co.

France
 Bordeaux
 Arman Brothers (1700s–1872)
 Ateliers and Chantiers de Bacalan (1868–1879)
 Dyle et Bacalan (1879–1936)
 Forges et Chantiers de la Gironde (1800s–1948)
 Bréhal:  Iguana Yachts (2008-)
 Brest: Brest Arsenal
 Caen: Chantiers Navals Français (1917–1954)
 Cherbourg:  Constructions Mécaniques de Normandie (CMN) (1945-)
 Dunkirk: Ateliers et Chantiers de France (ACF) (1898-1987)
 Grand-Quevilly: Ateliers et Chantiers de Saint-Nazaire Penhoët (1920s)
 Le Havre:  Chantiers et Ateliers Augustin Normand
 Les Herbiers:  Jeanneau (1957–)
 Nantes
 Ateliers et Chantiers de Bretagne (ACB) (1800s–1900s)
 Ateliers et Chantiers de la Loire (ACL) (1881–1955)
 Chantiers Dubigeon (1760–1987)
 Saint Nazaire
 Ateliers et Chantiers de la Loire (ACL) (1882–1955)
 Ateliers et Chantiers de Saint-Nazaire Penhoët (1861–1955)
 Chantiers de l'Atlantique (1955–)
 Shipbuilding groups:
 Naval Group (1631-)
 Société Nouvelle des Forges et Chantiers de la Méditerranée (1853–1966)

Germany
 Bremen
 AG Weser (1872–1983)
 Bremer Vulkan (1893–1997)
 Deutsche Schiff- und Maschinenbau AG (1926–1945)
 Lürssen (1875–)
 Bremerhaven: Schichau Seebeckwerft (1950–2009)
 Emden: Nordseewerke (1903–2010)
 Flensburg:  Flensburger Schiffbau-Gesellschaft (FSG) (1872–)
 Hamburg
 Blohm+Voss (1877–)
 Pella Sietas (1635-)
 Deutsche Werft (1918–1968)
 H. C. Stülcken Sohn (1846–1966)
 Kiel
 Deutsche Werke (1925–1945)
 German Naval Yards Kiel
 Germaniawerft (1867–1945)
 Howaldtswerke-Deutsche Werft (HDW) (1838–2005)
 Kaiserliche Werft Kiel (1867–1918)
 ThyssenKrupp Marine Systems (TKMS) (2005–)
 Kressbronn am Bodensee: Bodan-Werft (1919–2011)
 Lübeck: Flender Werke (1917–2002)
 Papenburg:  Meyer Werft (1795-)
 Rendsburg:  Nobiskrug (1905–)
 Rostock:  Neptun Werft (1850–)
 Stralsund:  Volkswerft (1945–)
 Wilhelmshaven
 Kaiserliche Werft Wilhelmshaven (1871–1918)
 Kriegsmarinewerft Wilhelmshaven (1918–1945)

Greece
 Basileiades
 Elefsis Shipyards
 Hellenic Shipyards Co. Skaramanga
 Neorion

Italy
 Azimut
 Baglietto La Spezia
 Benetti Viareggio
 FB Design Annone Brianza
 Ferretti Group
 Fincantieri
 Stabilimento Tecnico Triestino
 Cantiere navale di Ancona
 Regio Cantiere di Castellammare di Stabia
 Cantiere navale di Palermo
 Cantiere navale di Riva Trigoso
 Cantiere navale del Muggiano
 Perini Navi Viareggio
 Cantiere Navale Visentini Donada
 Rosetti Marino

Netherlands
 Royal IHC
 Barkmeijer Shipyards, Stroobos
 Damen Group
 Amels Holland B.V.
 Feadship
 Heesen Yachts
 Holland Jachtbouw Zaandam BV
 Royal Huisman
 ICON Yachts
 OceAnco
 Jongert

Norway
 Kleven Verft Ulsteinvik
 Moss Verft
 Ulstein Group Ulsteinvik

Poland
 Elbląg: F. Schichau (1854–1945)
 Gdańsk
 Danziger Werft (1921–1940)
 F. Schichau (1890–1945)
 Kaiserliche Werft Danzig (1871–1918)
 Stocznia Gdańsk (1945–)
 Szczecin
 AG Vulcan Stettin (1851–1945)
 Stocznia Szczecińska Nowa (1945–)

Portugal
 West Sea Shipyard Viana Do Castelo
 Lisnave - Estaleiros Navais SA Setúbal

Romania
 Damen Shipyards Galați (Galați)
 Mangalia shipyard (Mangalia)
 Constanţa Shipyard (Constanţa)

Russia

 Komsomolsk-on-Amur:  Amur Shipbuilding Plant (1932–)
 Polyarny:  Russian Shipyard Number 10 (1935–)
 Saint Petersburg
 Admiralty Shipyard (1704-)
 Almaz (1901–)
 Baltic Shipyard (1864–)
 Severnaya Verf (Northern Shipyard) (1890–)
 Sredne-Nevsky Shipyard (SNSZ) (1912–)
 Severodvinsk
 Sevmash (1939–)
 Zvezdochka
 Vyborg:  Vyborg Shipyard (1948–)

Spain
 Navantia

Sweden
 Dockstavarvet
 Eriksbergs Mekaniska Verkstad
 Götaverken
 Kockums Naval Solutions
 Lödöse varv
 Oskarshamn Shipyard

Turkey
 Ada Shipyard Tuzla, Istanbul
Aegean Yachts Shipyard Bodrum, Muğla and Antalya
Anadolu Shipyard Tuzla, Istanbul
Ares Shipyard Antalya
Argem Shipyard İstanbul
Art Shipyard İstanbul
ASTAS & SELTAS Shipyards İstanbul
Beșiktaș Shipyard Altınova, Yalova
Boğaziçi Shipyard Kadikoy, Istanbul and Yalova
Cemre Shipyard Altınova, Yalova, 
Çeksan Shipyard Istanbul
Gölcük Naval Shipyard, Gölcük, Kocaeli
Imperial Arsenal, currently named Haliç Shipyard
Inebolu Shipyard Kastamonu, İnebolu
Istanbul Naval Shipyard Tuzla, Istanbul
Sanmar Denizcilik Tuzla, Istanbul and Altinova, Yalova
Sedef Shipyard Istanbul 
Sefine ShipyardAltınova, Yalova
Su Marine Yachts Shipyard Tuzla, Istanbul
Tersan Shipyard Yalova and Tuzla, Istanbul

Ukraine 
 
 Kherson:  Kherson Shipyard (1950s-)
 Kyiv:  Kuznya na Rybalskomu (1928–)
 Mykolaiv
 Black Sea Shipyard (1895–)
 Mykolayiv Shipyard (1788-)
 Okean Shipyard (1951–)

United Kingdom

England
 Cornwall
 Falmouth: A&P Falmouth
 Cumbria
 Barrow-in-Furness
 Vickers Limited (1897–1927)
 Vickers-Armstrongs (1927–1977)
 Vickers Shipbuilding & Engineering (1977–2003)
 BAE Systems Submarines (2003–)
 Devon
 Appledore: Appledore Shipbuilders (1855-2019)
 Dartmouth: Philip and Son (1858–1999)
 Durham
 Haverton Hill: Furness Shipbuilding Company (1917–1979)
 Jarrow: Palmers Shipbuilding & Iron Company
 East Riding of Yorkshire
 Hessle: Henry Scarr (1897–1932); Richard Dunston (1932-1994)
 Hampshire
 Portsmouth Naval Base
 Vosper & Company (1871–1966)
 Vosper Thornycroft (1966–2008)
 BAE Systems Maritime - Naval Ships (2008–)
 Isle of Wight
 East Cowes
 J Samuel White (1700s–1963)
 Wight Shipyard
 Kent
Northfleet Shipyard (1788–1816)
 London
 Chiswick: Thornycroft (1866–1908)
 Leamouth: Thames Ironworks & Shipbuilding Company (1837–1912)
 Rotherhithe: The Pageants (1700s)
 London and Glasgow Shipbuilding Company (1864–1912)
 Merseyside
 Birkenhead: Cammell Laird (1828–1993)
 North Yorkshire
 Middlesbrough
 A&P Tees
 Parkol Marine Engineering (2017-)
 Smiths Dock Company (1907–1987)
 Whitby
 Parkol Marine Engineering
 South Yorkshire
 Thorne: Richard Dunston (1858–1985)
 Southampton
 Woolston: John I. Thornycroft & Company (1908–1966)
 Tyne and Wear
 Hebburn
 A&P Tyne
 A. Leslie and Company (1853–1886)
 Hawthorn Leslie and Company (1886–1982)
 High Walker Yard: Sir W. G. Armstrong Whitworth & Company (defunct 1927)
 North Shields: Smiths Dock Company (1810–1909)
 Pallion
 William Doxford & Sons (1870–1989)
 Short Brothers of Sunderland (1850–1964)
 South Shields: John Readhead & Sons (1865–1984)
 Southwick: Austin & Pickersgill (1838–1988)
 Sunderland
 Bartram & Sons (1838–1978)
 John Crown & Sons (1847-1947)
 Wallsend
 Swan Hunter (1880-2006)
 Willington Quay: Clelands Shipbuilding Company (1866-1984)

Northern Ireland
 Belfast: Harland and Wolff

Scotland
 Aberdeen: Hall, Russell & Company (1864–1992)
 Burntisland: Burntisland Shipbuilding Company (1918–1970)
 Clyde:
 Clydebank: John Brown & Company (1851–1972)
 Dumbarton: Denny (1811–1963)
 Govan
 BAE Systems Maritime - Naval Ships
 William Beardmore and Company (1900–1930)
 Fairfields (1834–1968)
 Robert Napier and Sons (1826–1900)
Greenock
Robert Steele & Company
 Linthouse: Alexander Stephens & Sons (1870–1968)
 Port Glasgow
 Ferguson Marine Engineering (1903–)
 William Hamilton and Company (1800s–1900s)
 Scotstoun
 BAE Systems Maritime - Naval Ships
 Barclay Curle
 Charles Connell and Company (1861–1980)
 Yarrow Shipbuilders (1865–1999)
 Upper Clyde Shipbuilders (1968–1972)
 Whiteinch: Barclay Curle
 Dundee: Caledon Shipbuilding & Engineering Company (1874–1980)
 Grangemouth: Grangemouth Dockyard Company (1885–1987)
 Leith: Henry Robb (1918–1983)
 Troon and Ayr: Ailsa Shipbuilding Company,  (1885–2000)

North America

Canada
 ABCO Industries
 A. F. Theriault Shipyard
 Allied Shipbuilders
 Davie Yards Incorporated
 MIL-Davie Shipbuilding (predecessor, 1986–2006)
 Davie Shipbuilding (predecessor, 1825–1986)
 Marine Industries (predecessor, 1936–1986)
 Irving Shipbuilding
 Halifax Shipyard (largest facility and HQ)
 Kiewit Corporation
 NewDock-St. John's Dockyard Company
 CN Marine (predecessor, 1977–1986)
 Port Weller Dry Docks
 Seaspan ULC
 Toronto Drydock Company

Defunct
 Bathurst Street Wharf
 Burrard Dry Dock
 North Van Ship Repair (absorbed by Burrard Dry Dock) 
 Canadian Power Boat Company
 Canadian Vickers 
 Collingwood Shipbuilding
 Morton Engineering and Dry Dock Company
 Penetanguishene Naval Yard
 Royal Naval Dockyard, Amherstburg
 Royal Naval Dockyard, Halifax (facilities continue to be used as CFB Halifax)
 Royal Naval Dockyard, Kingston
 Royal Naval Shipyard, Navy Island
 Russel Brothers
 Saint John Shipbuilding
 Victoria Machinery Depot
 Western Dry Dock and Shipbuilding Company
 Yarrow Shipbuilders Limited, Esquimalt 
 York Naval Shipyards

Mexico
 SEMAR (Veracruz Federal Shipbuilding)
 Carso Marina
 Pemex Construcción
 Veracruz Kukulkan Shipyards
 Zihuatanejo Marina
 Acapulco shipyards (Acapulco Naval Shipbuilding)

United States
 Alameda Works Shipyard, Alameda, California (1916–1956)
 American Shipbuilding, Cleveland, Ohio, Lorain, Ohio (1888–1995)
 Atlantic Basin Iron Works, Brooklyn, New York
 Austal USA, Mobile, Alabama
 Avondale Shipyard, Westwego, Louisiana
 BAE Systems Ship Repair, Norfolk, Virginia
 Bath Iron Works, Bath, Maine
 Bay Shipbuilding Company, Sturgeon Bay, Wisconsin
 Bethlehem Shipbuilding Corporation, Limited (BethShip) (1913–1964)
 Bethlehem Sparrows Point Shipyard, Sparrows Point, Maryland (1914–1997)
 Boston Navy Yard, Charlestown, Massachusetts
 Bollinger Shipyards, Lockport, Louisiana
 Brooklyn Navy Yard, Brooklyn, New York
 Brown Shipbuilding, Houston, Texas (1942–1985)
 Brown & Bell Shipyard, New York City (1824–1855)
 Burger Boat Company, Manitowoc, Wisconsin
 California Shipbuilding Corporation, Terminal Island, Los Angeles County, California
 Charleston Naval Shipyard, Charleston, South Carolina
 Chesapeake Shipbuilding, Salisbury, Maryland
 Chester Shipbuilding, Chester, Pennsylvania
 Commercial Iron Works, Portland, Oregon
 Consolidated Steel Orange Shipyard, Orange, Texas
 Defoe Shipbuilding Company, Bay City, Michigan (1905–1975)
 Delaware River Iron Ship Building and Engine Works, Chester, Pennsylvania
 Derecktor Shipyards, Mamaroneck, New York
 Dravo Corporation, Pittsburgh, Pennsylvania
 Edward F. Williams, Greenpoint, Brooklyn 
 Edward Knight Collins and the Collins Line, New York City (1818–1858)
 Electric Boat Corporation, Groton, Connecticut, Quonset Point, Rhode Island
 Federal Shipbuilding & Drydock, Newark, New Jersey (1917–1949)
 Fore River Shipyard, Quincy, Massachusetts (1901–1964)
 Gas Engine & Power Company & Charles L. Seabury Company, Morris Heights, Bronx, New York
 Giddings Boat Works, Charleston, Oregon 541-888-4712
General Dynamics, Quincy, Massachusetts
 General Engineering & Dry Dock Company, Alameda, California
 George Lawley & Sons, Neponset, Massachusetts
 Gladding-Hearn Shipbuilding, Somerset, Massachusetts
 Gulf Shipbuilding, Chickasaw, Alabama
 George Steers and Co, Greenpoint, Brooklyn
 Hans Ditlev Bendixsen, Fairhaven, California
 Henry B. Nevins, Incorporated, City Island, New York
 Higgins, New Orleans, Louisiana 
 Ingalls Shipbuilding, Pascagoula, Mississippi 
 Isaac C. Smith, Hoboken, New Jersey 
 Jakobson Shipyard, Oyster Bay, Long Island, New York
 James O. Curtis, Medford, Massachusetts
 Jeffersonville Boat & Machine, Jeffersonville, Indiana
 John H. Mathis & Company, Camden, New Jersey
 John Roach & Sons, Chester, Pennsylvania and New York City
 John Trumpy & Sons, Annapolis, Maryland
 Kaiser Shipyards
 Lake Washington Shipyard, Houghton, Washington
 Lawrence & Foulks, New York
 Lockheed Shipbuilding and Construction Company, Seattle, Washington formerly Puget Sound Bridge and Dredging Company
 Long Beach Naval Shipyard, Long Beach, California
 Los Angeles Shipbuilding and Drydock, Los Angeles, California
 Mare Island Naval Shipyard, Vallejo, California
 Marinette Marine, Marinette, Wisconsin
 Marinship – Bechtel Shipyards, Sausalito, California
 Maryland Drydock, Baltimore, Maryland
 Merchant Shipbuilding Corporation, Chester, Pennsylvania
 Moore Dry Dock Company, Oakland, California
 Morse Dry Dock & Repair Company, Brooklyn, New York
 National Steel and Shipbuilding Company, San Diego, California
 Neafie & Levy, Philadelphia, Pennsylvania
 New England Shipbuilding Corporation, South Portland, Maine
 Newport News Shipbuilding & Drydock, Newport News, Virginia
 New York Shipbuilding Corporation (New York Ship), Camden, New Jersey (1899–1967)
 Norfolk Naval Shipyard, Portsmouth, Virginia
 North Florida Shipyards, Inc., Jacksonville, Florida
 Oregon Shipbuilding Corporation, Portland, Oregon, part of the Kaiser Shipyards
 Pearl Harbor Naval Shipyard, Pearl Harbor, Hawaii
 Pennellville Historic District
 Philadelphia Naval Shipyard, Philadelphia, Pennsylvania
 Philly Shipyard, Philadelphia, Pennsylvania
 Portsmouth Naval Shipyard, Kittery, Maine
 Puget Sound Naval Shipyard, Bremerton, Washington
 Pusey and Jones, Wilmington, Delaware
 Reaney, Son & Archbold, Chester, Pennsylvania
 Richmond Shipyards, Richmond, California, part of the Kaiser Shipyards
 SAFE Boats International LLC, Bremerton, Washington
 Seattle-Tacoma Shipbuilding, Seattle, Washington
 Swiftships, Morgan City, Louisiana
 Sun Shipbuilding and Drydock Company, Chester, Pennsylvania
 Sun Shipbuilding and Drydock Company, Chester, Pennsylvania
 Tampa Shipbuilding, Tampa, Florida
 T. J. Southard (Richmond, Maine)
 United States Coast Guard Yard, Curtis Bay, Baltimore, Maryland
 Union Iron Works, San Francisco, California (1905–1941)
 Vigor Industrial, Washington, Oregon, and Alaska
 VT Halter Marine, Pascagoula, Mississippi
 Western Pipe & Steel, San Francisco, California
 William Cramp & Sons Shipbuilding Company, Philadelphia, Pennsylvania
 William H. Webb shipyard, New York City
 Westervelt & Co. shipyard, New York City
 Winslow Marine Railway & Shipbuilding, Winslow, Washington, Seattle, Washington
 Zidell Marine – Portland, Oregon

Oceania

Australia
 Adelaide Steamship Company (Birkenhead, South Australia) (1957–1973)
 Austal (Henderson, Western Australia)
 ASC, (Osborne, South Australia and Henderson, Western Australia)
 ASC Shipbuilding, (Osborne, South Australia)
 Australian Marine Complex (Henderson, Western Australia)
 BAE Systems Australia (Henderson, Western Australia and Williamstown, Victoria)
 BHP (Whyalla, South Australia) (1939–1978)
 BSC Marine Group, (Toowong, Queensland)
 Cairncross Dockyard, (Morningside, Queensland)
 Civmec, (Henderson, Western Australia)
 Cockatoo Docks & Engineering Company (Sydney, New South Wales) (1870–1992)
 de Havilland Marine, (Bankstown, New South Wales)
 Evans Deakin & Company (Brisbane, Queensland) (1940–1971)
 Forgacs Marine & Defence (Tomago, New South Wales)
 Incat (Hobart, Tasmania)
 Lars Halvorsen Sons, (Sydney, New South Wales)
 Morrison & Sinclair (Sydney, New South Wales) (1890s – 1970)
 Mort's Dock & Engineering Company (Sydney, New South Wales) (1855–1959)
 Norman R Wright & Sons, (Bulimba, Queensland)
 NQEA (Cairns, Queensland)
 Osborne Naval Shipyard, (Osborne, South Australia)
 Poole & Steel, (Sydney, New South Wales) (1912–1954)
 Richardson Devine Marine (Hobart, Tasmania)
 State Dockyard (Newcastle, New South Wales) (1942–1987)
 Walkers Limited (Maryborough, Queensland) (1884–1974)
 Walsh Island Dockyard & Engineering Works, (Newcastle, New South Wales)
 Williamstown Dockyard. Williamstown, Victoria)

South America

Argentina
 Astillero "Río Santiago" (AFNE) (Ensenada, Buenos Aires)
 Astilleros Argentinos S.A. (ASTARSA)
 Puerto Belgrano Naval Base shipyard
 Tandanor

Brazil
 INACE
 EMGEPRON

Chile
 Asenav Valdivia
 ASMAR Talcahuano, Valparaíso, Punta Arenas

Colombia
 COTECMAR

Peru
 SIMA

See also
 List of the largest shipbuilding companies

References

History-related lists
Shipbuilding companies
Shipyards
Lists of industrial buildings